The men's 500 metres in speed skating at the 1994 Winter Olympics took place on 14 February, at the Hamar Olympic Hall.

Records
Prior to this competition, the existing world and Olympic records were as follows:

The following new Olympic records were set during this competition.

Results

References

Men's speed skating at the 1994 Winter Olympics